Mirny is a rural locality (a settlement) in Pervomaysky Selsoviet of Yegoryevsky District, Altai Krai, Russia. The population was 282 as of 2014. There are 4 streets.

Geography 
Mirny is located 38 km east of Novoyegoryevskoye (the district's administrative centre) by road. Tishinka is the nearest rural locality.

References 

Rural localities in Yegoryevsky District, Altai Krai